Military operations took place in Ladakh in 1948 during the conflict in Jammu and Kashmir between the Indian Army and Pakistani raiders infiltrated to capture the kingdom of Jammu and Kashmir. The eviction of this invading force of tribal raiders, who enjoyed numerical superiority, better lines of communication, commanding high ground and superior logistics, was a major military achievement for the small force of Indian soldiers.

Relief of Leh
Pakistani raiders had besieged and reduced Skardu in early 1948. It was vital that Leh, the next likely target, be relieved before it was attacked by the raiders. Maj Prithi Chand, a Lahauli officer with a band of 40 volunteers from the 2nd Battalion, Dogra Regiment began a hazardous mid-winter ascent of Zojila pass on 16 February 1948, with rifles and ammunition for the garrison. They reached Leh on 8 March, where an ad hoc force for defence was organised, followed soon by a Jammu and Kashmir State Forces detachment bringing additional weapons.

Reinforcement of Leh
The slow advance of raiders permitted reinforcement of Leh by air by a company of 2nd Battalion, 4 Gorkha Rifles (2/4 GR) and later a company of 2nd Battalion, 8th Gorkha Rifles (2/8 GR) by air just in time to repulse the raiders. Had the raiders kept advancing they could have captured Leh easily.  The garrison of Leh held despite shortage of troops, weapons and ammunition, sickness and fatigue. In August another company of 2/8 GR was flown in by air and the remaining part of the battalion, codenamed Arjun column, with a large column of supplies on mules, trekked to Leh from Manali. Another large mule column, codenamed Chapati column, followed in September to provide adequate supplies for the winter. Lt Col (later Col) HS Parab, CO 2/8 GR, was airlifted to Leh on 23 Aug and later designated Commander, Leh Brigade (though the force never exceeded two battalions in strength). Spirited small unit actions and guerilla raids on both banks of the Indus effectively held the raiders at bay throughout September and October.

Capture of Zoji La

When Zoji La fell to the enemy in May 1948, it was vital for the Indians that the pass be recaptured before winter so as to relieve Leh. An unsuccessful frontal attack was launched by 77 Parachute Brigade under Brig Hiralal Atal to capture Zoji La pass. Operation Duck, the earlier epithet for this assault, was renamed as Operation Bison by Lt Gen Cariappa, the Western Army commander.  M5 Stuart light tanks of 7 Cavalry were moved in dismantled conditions through Srinagar to Baltal while the superhuman efforts of two field companies of the Madras Sappers working day and night improved the mule track from Baltal up the Zoji La to Gumri.   The surprise attack on 1 November by the brigade with armour, led by the division commander Thimayya in the lead tank, and supported by two regiments of 25 pounders and a regiment of 3.7 inch guns, saw the enemy being surprised. The pass was forced and the enemy pushed back to Matayan.

Liberation of Leh and Kargil

Since the raiders were inactive on the Leh front during 77 Para Brigade's operations in Zoji La, Leh Brigade went onto the offensive advancing from Tharu to Marol on the north bank of the Indus and from Chilling to Lamayuru to Kargil on the south bank.  Another detachment advanced along the Shyok River clearing opposition on that axis and securing the Nubra Valley flank.

On the Zoji La front, 77 Parachute Brigade launched a deliberate attack and captured Matayan on 13 November and Dras on 15 November. The brigade linked up on 24 November at Kargil with Indian troops advancing from Leh while the enemy withdrew northwards toward Skardu. The Indian pursuit was halted by fierce enemy action at Chathatang as the enemy soldiers blew themselves under Indian tanks to save their posts, 5 km ahead of the Marol fork of the Indus. The strong enemy defenses, on both banks of the Indus, resisted till 1 January 1949 when a ceasefire was called.

References

Ladakh
Indo-Pakistani War of 1947–1948
Ladakh